Jörgen Brink (born March 10, 1974 in Delsbo, Hälsingland) is a retired Swedish cross-country skier and biathlete who has competed since 1994. He earned three bronze medals at the 2003 FIS Nordic World Ski Championships in Val di Fiemme (10 km + 10 km double pursuit, 50 km, and 4 × 10 km relay). 

Brink's best finish at the Winter Olympics was a 24th in the individual sprint in 2002. He won eleven FIS races from 1995 to 2006 at all distances. On March 7, 2010, he won the 90 km ski marathon race Vasaloppet, beating Daniel Tynell to the finishing line by a very narrow margin. Brink's winning time was 4 hours, 2 minutes and 59 seconds. On March 6, 2011 he won Vasaloppet again, beating Stanislav Řezáč by one second. His winning time was 3 hours, 51 minutes and 51 seconds. In 2012, he set a new Vasaloppet record by 16 seconds, winning at 3 hours, 38 minutes and 41 seconds. It was his third consecutive Vasaloppet win.

On 18 April 2019, he announced his retirement from cross-country skiing.

Cross-country skiing results
All results are sourced from the International Ski Federation (FIS).

Olympic Games

World Championships
 3 medals – (3 bronze)

World Cup

Season standings

Individual podiums
 1 victory 
 5 podiums

Team podiums
 2 victories 
 4 podiums

References

External links
 Official website 
 

1974 births
Living people
People from Hudiksvall Municipality
Cross-country skiers from Gävleborg County
Swedish male cross-country skiers
Cross-country skiers at the 2002 Winter Olympics
Cross-country skiers at the 2006 Winter Olympics
Vasaloppet winners
Olympic cross-country skiers of Sweden
Swedish male biathletes
FIS Nordic World Ski Championships medalists in cross-country skiing
Hudiksvalls IF skiers